Statistics of the Scottish Football League in season 1952–53.

Scottish League Division A

Scottish League Division B

See also
1952–53 in Scottish football

References

 
Scottish Football League seasons